Snot may refer to:

 Snot, slang for nasal mucus or dried nasal mucus
 Snot, a character from the US television show American Dad!
 Sid Snot, an ageing biker character performed by Kenny Everett
 Snot, a character from the video game Earthworm Jim
 Snots, a dog from the film National Lampoon's Christmas Vacation
 Snot (band), an American hardcore punk band
 Snot (rapper), rapper from Florida
 Snot, the Saxon chieftain for whom the city of Nottingham is originally named
 Snot Dudley, American wrestler